Sheepridge is a district of Huddersfield, West Yorkshire, England.

Sheepridge is situated between Brackenhall, Deighton and Fartown.

A public well was established in the district following the passing of the Huddersfield Act in 1906.

References

Areas of Huddersfield